Tightrope Books is a Canadian independent book publisher based in Toronto, Ontario, Canada.

Founded in 2005 by Halli Villegas, Tightrope Books publishes mainly poetry and fiction, as well as non-fiction and anthologies. As a "writer-centric press," Tightrope Books involves its authors and poets in the publishing process. According to Villegas, Tightrope Books “prides itself on introducing readers to writers who are a little bit out there,” working with both new and established authors who are open to experimentation. Tightrope Books was purchased by Jim Nason in 2014.

Tightrope Books is represented by the Independent Publishers Group (IPG).

Annual publications
Among the publications are the annual anthologies, Best Canadian Poetry in English and Best Canadian Essays. For both series, the series and guest editors collaborate and choose the best poems and essays by Canadians published in the preceding year from online and print Canadian literary journals.

The idea for the anthologies sprung from The Best American Poetry Series created by David Lehman.

Best Canadian Poetry in English 

The Best Canadian Poetry in English 2008

Editors: Stephanie Bolster and Molly Peacock

Writers: Maleea Acker, James Arthur, Leanne Averbach, Margaret Avison, Ken Babstock, John Wall Barger, Brian Bartlett, John Barton, Yvonne Blomer, Tim Bowling, Heather Cadsby, Anne Compton, Kevin Connolly, Meira Cook, Dani Couture, Sadiqa de Meijer, Barry Dempster, Jeramy Dodds, Jeffery Donaldson, Susan Elmslie, Jason Guriel, Aurian Haller, Jason Heroux, Iain Higgins, Bill Howell, Helen Humphreys, Amanda Lamarche, Tim Lilburn, Michael Lista, Keith Maillard, Don McKay, A. F. Moritz, Jim Nason, Peter Norman, Alison Pick, E. Alex Pierce, Craig Poile, Matt Rader, Michael Eden Reynolds, Shane Rhodes, Joy Russell, Heather Sellers, David Seymour, J. Mark Smith, Adam Sol, Carmine Starnino, Anna Swanson, Todd Swift, J.R. Toriseva, and Leif E. Vaage.

The Best Canadian Poetry in English 2009

Editors: A. F. Moritz and Molly Peacock

Writers: Margaret Atwood, Margaret Avison, Ken Babstock, Shirley Bear, Tim Bowling, Asa Boxer, Anne Compton, Jan Conn, Lorna Crozier, Barry Dempster, Don Domanski, John Donlan, Tyler Enfield, Jesse Ferguson, Connie Fife, Adam Getty, Steven Heighton, Michael Johnson, Sonnet L'Abbe, Anita Lahey, M. Travis Lane, Evelyn Lau, Richard Lemm, Dave Margoshes, Don McKay, Eric Miller, Shane Neilson, Peter Norman, David O'Meara, P. K. Page, Elise Partridge, Elizabeth Philips, Meredith Quartermain, Matt Rader, John Reibetanz, Robyn Sarah, Peter Dale Scott, Cora Sire, Karen Solie, Carmine Starnino, John Steffler, Ricardo Sternberg, John Terpstra, Sharon Thesen, Matthew Tierney, Patrick Warner, Tom Wayman,  Patricia Young, Changming Yuan, and Jan Zwicky.

The Best Canadian Poetry in English 2010

Editors: Lorna Crozier and Molly Peacock

Writers: Ken Babstock, John Barton, Anne Compton, Allan Cooper, Mary Dalton, Barry Dempster, Kildare Dobbs, Don Domanski, Glen Downie, Sue Goyette, Rosemary Griebel, Adrienne Gruber, Jamella Hagen, Steven Heighton, Warren Heiti, M.G.R. Hickman-Barr, Maureen Hynes, Michael Johnson, Jim Johnstone, Sonnet L'Abbé,  Fiona Tinwei Lam, Evelyn Lau, Katherine Lawrence, Ross Leckie, Tim Lilburn, Dave Margoshes, Jim Nason, Catherine Owen, P. K. Page, Rebecca Leah Papucaru, Marilyn Gear Pilling, Lenore and Beth Rowntree, Armand Garnet Ruffo, Lori Saint-Martin, Peter Sanger, Robyn Sarah, Eleonore Schönmaier, David Seymour, Melanie Siebert, Sue Sinclair, Karen Solie, Nick Thran, Carey Toane, Anne-Marie Turza, Paul Tyler, Patrick Warner, Zachariah Wells, Patricia Young, David Zieroth, and Jan Zwicky.

Sources of Poems

2008:
PRISM international
Brick
Contemporary Verse 2
Matrix
The Malahat Review
Event
Descant
The Fiddlehead
Maisonneuve
enRoute
This Magazine
Arc
Antigonish Review
Exile
Canadian Literature
Prairie Fire
Border Crossings
Grain
Literary Review of Canada
The Capilano Review
Room
Vallum

2009:
Descant
Brick
The Fiddlehead
West Coast LINE
Arc
Literary Review of Canada
Maisonneuve
Vallum
Canadian Literature
Prairie Fire
Event
Grain
The Dalhousie Review
Hammered Out
The New Quarterly
Queen's Quarterly
The Antigonish Review
subTerrain
The Malahat Review
This Magazine
The Walrus
The Capilano Review
The Nashwaak Review

2010:
Literary Review of Canada
Arc
Riddle Fence
Studio
The Malahat Review
Prairie Fire
Exile
enRoute
Event
The Walrus
Grain
The New Quarterly
The Fiddlehead
PRISM international
Room
Queen's Quarterly
The Dalhousie Review
Existere
Descant
Geist
The Antigonish Review
Brick
This Magazine
Canadian Notes & Queries
Contemporary Verse 2

Best Canadian Essays 

The Best Canadian Essays 2009

Editor: Alex Boyd and Carmine Starnino

Writers: Kamal Al-Solaylee, Katherine Ashenburg, Kris Demeanor, Jessa Gamble, Nicholas Hune-Brown, Chris Koentges, Anita Lahey, Alison Lee, Nick Mount, Denis Seguin, Chris Turner, Lori Theresa Waller, Nathan Whitlock, and Chris Wood.

The Best Canadian Essays 2010

Editors: Alex Boyd and Kamal Al-Solaylee

Writers: Katherine Ashenburg, Ira Basen, Will Braun, Tyee Bridge, Abou Farman, Paul Gallant, Lisa Gregoire, Danielle Groen, Elizabeth Hay, Jason McBride, Carolyn Morris, Katharine Sandiford, Andrew Steinmetz, Timothy Taylor, Chris Turner, and Nora Underwood.

Sources of Essays

2009:
Canadian Notes & Queries
Toronto Life
Unlimited
Up Here
Swerve
Maisonneuve
This Magazine
Queen's Quarterly
The Walrus
Alberta Views
Briarpatch Magazine

2010:
Vancouver Magazine
Maisonneuve
Geez
Swerve
This Magazine
Canadian Geographic
Chatelaine
New Quarterly
Toronto Life
Up Here
Queen's Quarterly
The Walrus
Alberta Views

Other titles
Fortune Cookie by Heather J. Wood
In the Dark Stories From The Supernatural edited by Myna Wallin and Halli Villegas
The Stone Skippers by Ian Burgham
She's Shameless edited by Stacey May Fowles and Megan Griffith-Greene
GULCH edited by Sarah Beaudin, Karen Correia Da Silva, and Curran Folkers
The Girl on the Escalator by Jim Nason
Confessions of a Reluctant Cougar by Myna Wallin
A Thousand Profane Pieces by Myna Wallin
Onion Man by Kathryn Mockler

Recognition
The Nights Also (2010) by Anna Swanson was awarded the 23rd Annual Lambda Literary Award for Lesbian Poetry.  It made the 2011 Gerald Lampert Memorial Award shortlist.

Wrong Bar (2009) by Nathaniel G. Moore made the 2010 ReLit Award novel shortlist.

References

External links
Tightrope Books

Book publishing companies of Canada
Small press publishing companies
Companies based in Toronto
Publishing companies established in 2005